Sher Dhan Rai was sworn in as Chief Minister of Province No. 1 on 15 February 2018. Here is the list of ministers.

Chief Minister & Cabinet Ministers 

Till March 2021

Minister of State

See also 

 Lalbabu Raut cabinet
  Astalaxmi Shakya Cabinet
 Krishna Chandra Nepali cabinet
Kul Prasad KC cabinet
Mahendra Bahadur Shahi cabinet
Trilochan Bhatta cabinet

References

External links 

 Office of Chief Minister and Council of Ministers of Province No. 1

Provincial cabinets of Nepal
2018 establishments in Nepal
Government of Koshi Province